Niederneukirchen is a municipality in the district Linz-Land in the Austrian state of Upper Austria.

Geography
Niederneukirchen lies about 25 km south of Linz. About 10 percent of the municipality is forest, and 80 percent is farmland.

Population

References

Cities and towns in Linz-Land District